Muhammad Asif is a Pakistani Professional snooker player who represents Pakistan in different international tournaments. He is a two-time winner of the amateur IBSF World Snooker Championship. In 2022, he turned professional.

Career
In December 2012, Asif won the IBSF World Snooker Championship held in Sofia, Bulgaria, by defeating England's Gary Wilson 10–8.

In August 2017, Asif and Babar Masih representing Pakistan-2 defeated Muhammad Sajjad and Asjad Iqbal representing Pakistan-1 to win the IBSF World 6-Red Team Championship.
	
In September 2018, Asif along with Babar Masih won the Asian Team Snooker Championship held in Doha, Qatar, by defeating India's Pankaj Advani and Malkeet Singh 3–2 in the final.

In November 2019, Asif defeated Jefrey Roda of the Philippines 8–5 in Antalya, Turkey to win his second IBSF World Snooker Championship title. He returned to a hero's welcome in Karachi.

In June 2022, Asif earned a two-year card on the World Snooker Tour by winning the semifinal in the first event of the Asia-Oceania Q School against Asjad Iqbal.

Performance and rankings timeline

Career finals

Team finals: 4 (3 titles)

Amateur finals: 7 (6 titles)

See also
 Muhammad Yousaf

References

External links
Muhammad Asif at wst.tv

Living people
Sportspeople from Faisalabad
Snooker players from Punjab, Pakistan
1982 births
Pakistani snooker players